Sphecomyia hoguei is a species of syrphid fly in the family Syrphidae.

Distribution
United States.

References

Eristalinae
Insects described in 2019
Diptera of North America
Hoverflies of North America